Inspector Gadget is a media franchise spawned by the 1983 animated series of the same name.

Inspector Gadget may also refer to:

Film and television
 Inspector Gadget (1983 TV series), the original animated series
 Inspector Gadget (film), 1999 live-action film
 Inspector Gadget 2, sequel to the 1999 film
 Inspector Gadget (2015 TV series), a 3D animated series based on the original

Video games
 Inspector Gadget (video game), 1993
Inspector Gadget: Mission 1 – Global Terror!, released 1992
Inspector Gadget: Operation Madkactus
Inspector Gadget: Gadget's Crazy Maze, released 2001
Inspector Gadget: Advance Mission, released 2001
Inspector Gadget: Mad Robots Invasion, released 2003

Other uses
 Inspector Gadget (blogger), British police blogger